This article covers the television stations established in Nepal and Nepali-language television stations all around the world.

Television in Nepal was first introduced in 1983 (Bikram Samwat 2042) as Nepal Television commonly abbreviated as NTV. It is owned by the Nepalese Government.

List of Television Stations inside Nepal

List of television stations outside Nepal

Most viewed channels

Internet TV

 Himal TV Australia
 Rural TV Nepal
 Voice of Nepal TV (VON)
 Saugat Tv
Creative Blues TV
 Nepali Darwin TV (NDTV)

See also

List of programs broadcast by Nepal Television
Nepal Television
Image Channel
MegaTelevision
Nepal Network TV (NNTV)
Kantipur Television

References

External links
 Rural TV Nepal
 Voice of Nepal TV (VON)
 Makalu TV HD
 Business TV Nepal
 Times TV
 Krishi Television HD
 Indigenous Television
 Zee Nepal HD TV
   Appan Television 
 Nepal Network TV (NNTV)  
 NEPALI DARWIN TV (NDTV)  
Television channels in Nepal
television stations